Hertford College, previously known as Magdalen Hall, is a constituent college of the University of Oxford in England. It is located on Catte Street in the centre of Oxford, directly opposite the main gate to the Bodleian Library. The college is known for its iconic bridge, the Bridge of Sighs. There are around 600 students at the college at any one time, comprising undergraduates, graduates and visiting students from overseas.

The first foundation on the Hertford site began in the 1280s as Hart Hall and became a college in 1740 but was dissolved in 1816. In 1820, the site was taken over by Magdalen Hall, which had emerged around 1490 on a site adjacent to Magdalen College.  In 1874, Magdalen Hall was incorporated as a college, reviving the name Hertford College. In 1974, Hertford was part of the first group of all-male Oxford colleges to admit women.

Alumni of the college's predecessor institutions include William Tyndale, John Donne, Thomas Hobbes, and Jonathan Swift. More recently, former students have included author Evelyn Waugh, the first female Home Secretary Jacqui Smith, the civil servants Jeremy Heywood and Olly Robbins, and the newsreaders and reporters Fiona Bruce, Carrie Gracie, Krishnan Guru-Murthy, and Natasha Kaplinsky. U.S. justice Byron White attended the college on a Rhodes scholarship but left to serve in World War II.

Hart Hall and the first Hertford College

Hart Hall 

The first Hertford College began life as Hart Hall (Aula Cervina) in the 1280s, a small tenement built roughly where the college's Old Hall is today, a few paces along New College Lane on the southern side. In mediaeval Oxford, academic halls were primarily lodging houses for students and resident tutors.

The original tenement, mentioned in the deed of 1283, which was bought by Elias de Hertford from Walter de Grendon, mercer, lay between a tenement of the university (Blackhall) on the west, and a tenement of the Prioress of Studley on the east. In the deed by which Elias de Hertford sells it to John de Dokelynton in 1301, this last tenement is called Micheldhall.  The deed was made over to his son, also Elias, in 1301. The name of the hall was likely a humorous reduction of the name of its founder's home town, and allowed for the use of the symbol of a hart to be used for identification.

At that time, New College Lane was known as Hammer Hall Lane (named after a hall to the east, as New College had not then been founded), and its northern side was the old town wall. The corner of Hammer Hall Lane and Catte Street (which had a postern in the wall called Smithgate) was taken by Black Hall, which was the place of John Wycliffe's imprisonment by the Vice-Chancellor around 1378. On the other side of Hart Hall along the lane was Shield Hall. On Catte Street itself was the entrance to Arthur Hall, which lay down a narrow passage behind Hart Hall, and Cat Hall (Aula Murilegorum), which stood further south, roughly where the Principal's Lodgings now stand.

The younger Elias sold on Hart Hall (named in this deed as 'le Herthalle') after a month to a wealthy local fishmonger John of Ducklington, who, seven years later, bought Arthur Hall and annexed it to Hart Hall. In 1312, John sold the two halls to Walter de Stapledon, Bishop of Exeter, who desired to found a college. After just over a year, Stapledon moved his scholars to a larger site that he had purchased on Turl Street, which became Stapledon Hall, later Exeter College. However, Exeter College retained certain rights over Hart Hall, with which it plagued the hall's development for centuries.

In 1379, Hart Hall and Black Hall were rented by William of Wykeham as a temporary home for his scholars as his New College, to the east along what became New College Lane, was being built. The first two Wardens of New College also appear as Principals of Hart Hall. Until the 17th century, there is evidence of scholars (including Thomas Ken) matriculating at Hart Hall while waiting for a vacancy at New College. By this time, it appears that Shield Hall had been partly taken over by Hart Hall and partly demolished to make way for New College's cloister. Although Black Hall continued a separate existence, its principal was often the same as Hart Hall's. In 1490, Hart Hall is described as having a library, which was unusual for a hall. In 1530, Hart Hall annexed Black Hall also. For some time, Cat Hall was leased by All Souls College, and then by Exeter College, until it also was subsumed into the growing Hart Hall early in the 16th century, giving the hall most of the land around what is today its Old Quadrangle.

In the latter half of the 16th century, Hart Hall became known as a refuge for Catholic recusants, particularly under Philip Randell as principal (1548–1599). Because of its connection with Exeter College and that college's increasing puritanism, a number of Exeter's tutors and scholars migrated to Hart Hall. The hall attracted an increasing number of Catholics from further afield, including the Jesuit tutor Richard Holtby in 1574, who was instrumental in the conversion of his student, and later Jesuit martyr and saint, Alexander Briant to Catholicism. Coming from a Catholic family, the English poet John Donne came up to Hart Hall in 1584.

Hart Hall expanded and new buildings were put up. In the early 17th century, the current Senior Common Room was built as lodgings for the principal. From this period also, the main entrance of the hall moved from being a narrow passage off New College Lane to a gate on Catte Street. By the late 17th century, Cat Hall is described as being used as 'the ball-court of Hart Hall'. In the latter part of the 17th century, the principal, Dr William Thornton, provided a proper gate for the Catte Street entrance of the hall, and decorated with a device of a drinking hart with the motto  ('As the hart panteth after the water brooks', taken from Psalm 42, verse 1, but in a peculiar translation). Although the current gatehouse is not Thornton's original, it retains the design and motto, and houses the original decorated gates. It has been suggested that this frieze with its Latin motto is the real counterpart of the one translated for the waiting crowd by the title character of Thomas Hardy's Jude the Obscure.

In 1692, the political satirist Jonathan Swift was incorporated from Trinity College, Dublin, on the books of Hart Hall to receive his MA.

Richard Newton's Hertford College 
On 28 July 1710, the Rev Dr Richard Newton was admitted principal of Hart Hall. Newton was a well-connected, energetic, educational reformer. He was appointed principal from 'a very peaceful retirement' as Rector of Sudborough, where he was personal tutor to two brothers, who were both destined to be prime minister — Thomas Pelham-Holles and Henry Pelham — bringing the younger with him to Hart Hall. He dedicated himself to raising the hall from debt and securing a firmer financial endowment. Newton planned to redesign the hall around a proper quadrangle, with a tutor, or angler, and students living in each angle, and common buildings along the sides. However, only two buildings in his design were ever built: one angle in the south-east corner of the Old Quadrangle (nowadays known as the Cottage), and his simple stone Chapel on the south side (consecrated 25 November 1716), which now serves as the college's Library. These buildings were financed entirely from Newton's pocket, to the sum of around £2000 (around £ adjusted for inflation).

In 1720, Newton published his Scheme of Disciplines laying out his scheme of education with a view to obtaining a charter of incorporation, and, on 18 May 1723, he presented his petition for a charter. The proposal met immediate opposition, especially from Exeter College, exercising its old rights, and All Souls, desiring to expand northward onto the hall's land. In addition, the appointments of principals for the various halls had established itself in a game of promotion, and a few would-be principals opposed the plan. John Conybeare, then a Fellow of Exeter, and later Bishop of Bristol, was Newton's most ardent opponent, penning the book Calumny Refuted against Newton's reforms. After years of struggle, Richard Newton's statutes were accepted on 3 November 1739, and the charter incorporating 'the Principal and Fellows of Hertford College' (Principalis et Socii Collegii Hertfordiensis) was received on 8 September 1740.

Newton's Hertford was a relatively spartan college, having received no real endowment. Meals were simple and cheap, and the principal insisted on eating the same as everyone else. Students were expected to work hard, and, where Newton found the university's education lacking, he supplemented it with disputations within the college. Newton allowed gentlemen-commoners to matriculate at the college, but they paid double fees for the same accommodation and food as the others. They were originally allowed to wear their coloured gowns and tufted caps, but Newton eventually made them wear the ordinary black gown. Thus, many a well-to-do family sent their sons to Hertford College to instil in them some disciplined education, unlike the privileged wining and dining had by gentlemen-commoners in other colleges.

Decline and dissolution 
After Richard Newton's death in 1753, the principalship of the college fell to a succession of men mostly lacking the desire or energy to continue their predecessor's plan. One exception to this succession was David Durell, who built up the reputation and academic success of the college. Under Durell, the future statesman Charles James Fox matriculated in 1764 (Hertford, unusually for Oxford, was a Whig college). However, the scheme of four tutors in their respective angles was reduced to two, and cheaper junior fellows took over some of the burden of tutoring. It was at Hertford that the tutor Benjamin Blayney prepared his 1769 Standard Edition of the Authorized King James Version of the Bible. Apart from Durell's principalship, the college went into decline due to the mismanagement of uninterested principals and the lack of decent endowments. In May 1805, Bernard Hodgson, last principal of Hertford College died, and no suitable successor could be found and agreed upon. By 1810, matriculation had ceased, and the last students were awarded their degrees. The last tutor and vice-principal, Richard Hewitt, continued to live in his rooms without students until May 1816, when a commission declared Hertford College dissolved.

Magdalen Hall and the second Hertford College

Magdalen Hall 

Magdalen Hall was founded around 1490 on a site to the west of Magdalen College and next to Magdalen's grammar school. The site is now Magdalen's St Swithun's quadrangle. It took the name of an earlier Magdalen Hall in the High Street, which was founded by William Waynflete in 1448 and then closed on the opening of Magdalen College in 1458. The first master of the grammar school was appointed in 1480, and its original school building was erected in 1486. However, as the hall took independent students as well as those belonging to the college, it quickly became an independent institution under its own principal.

The hall was known for its adherence to the teachings of John Wycliffe, and William Tyndale, translator of the English Bible and martyr, studied there. Another famous student of the hall was the political philosopher Thomas Hobbes, who came up in either 1601 or 1602. At the English Civil War, Magdalen Hall was known as a Puritan hall under the principalship of Henry Wilkinson. Famous Puritan graduates include Philip Nye, key adviser to Oliver Cromwell on matters of religion and regulation of the Church. The hall rarely used a badge of arms, but, when it did, it used the same arms as the college.

At the time of the demise of the first Hertford College, Magdalen College had long been searching for a way of expelling Magdalen Hall in order to expand into its buildings. Before the demise of Hertford, Magdalen College conspired to make its site ready to receive a transplanted Magdalen Hall. The current Lodge of Hertford College thus still bears the arms of Magdalen Hall (and so also of Magdalen College) beside those of Hertford College (and Hart Hall) and the university.

Move to Catte Street 

John Macbride became both principal of Magdalen Hall and Lord Almoner's Professor of Arabic in 1813, and plans to move the hall to the site of Hertford College were already afoot. On 15 March 1815, Magdalen College submitted a proposal for the move to Convocation. Magdalen College proposed to repair the Hertford buildings and defray the expense of Magdalen Hall's move to the site, while the hall were to relinquish claim to their own buildings to Magdalen College. An Act of Parliament was passed supporting the plan, but no move was made until a fire accidentally started by an undergraduate on 9 January 1820 destroyed almost half of Magdalen Hall's buildings. Not long after this, one of Hertford College's buildings on Catte Street, so flimsy that it was known as the 'paper building', collapsed. With this motivation, the new foundation stone of Magdalen Hall was laid at the new site on 3 May 1820, and the hall's migration was complete by 1822. The Catte Street frontage was pulled down and rebuilt, and several buildings had an extra storey added to them. Magdalen Hall expanded to fill the space, and became the largest hall by far, numbering 214 members in 1846. Macbride and his vice-principals were active in building up the refounded Magdalen Hall. To distance the hall from its namesake college, Macbride attempted to change the name to 'Magdalene Hall', but this change was never accepted. Macbride served as principal for 54 years, until his death in 1868. The Macbride Sermon, one of the University Sermons, is preached each Hilary term in the Chapel of Hertford College in his memory.

Refounding of Hertford College 

During John Macbride's principalship it became clear that the growing, energetic Magdalen Hall should be incorporated as a college to match its academic standing in the university. Since the name 'Magdalen College' was already taken, the favoured option was the revival of 'Hertford College'. Macbride was succeeded as principal by his vice-principal, Richard Michell, in 1868. He brought a bill before Parliament in 1873 for the incorporation of Magdalen Hall as Hertford College. The bill received significant financial support from Thomas Baring, then newly elected MP for South Essex. Baring had been a Fellow of Brasenose College, and had offered a substantial endowment of fellowships and scholarships to that college, but it had been refused, as Brasenose rejected his conditions of restricting the funds to members of the Church of England. However, to ease the passage of the bill, Baring removed his condition to the first instalment of the endowment (subsequent instalments were restricted), and Magdalen Hall was incorporated as 'the Principal, Fellows, and Scholars of Hertford College' (Principalis, Socii, et Scholastici Collegii Hertfordiensis) on 7 August 1874. Thus, Michell became the last principal of Magdalen Hall and the first principal of the refounded Hertford College.

Baring bought a house across New College Lane from the college to serve as fellows' lodgings (at some point this house was named Clarendon House), which was the first move of the college onto the northern side of New College Lane. This was soon followed by the purchase of other houses on that side of the road, which were collectively known as Ædes, and the old Chapel of Our Lady at Smithgate (which is now the Octagon, housing the Middle Common Room). Also during this period, a gatehouse was built on the Catte Street frontage and the old doors were reinstalled there. A new dining hall was built above the gatehouse, and much of the northern side of the Old Quadrangle, apart from Old Hall, was rebuilt.

In 1877, Henry Boyd succeeded Michell, becoming the second principal of the refounded Hertford College. His energy, good connections and longevity created the modern college as it is today. Boyd's name appears carved on the landmark Bridge of Sighs, and he is commemorated by a memorial in the Chapel (to the left of the chancel) and a portrait in the Hall (at the west end of High Table). Boyd's partnership with the architect Thomas Graham Jackson brought about the expansion of the college and its endowment with its iconic 'Anglo-Jackson' buildings. In 1887, Jackson began work on the Gatehouse, the Hall and its spiral staircase, and the north range of the Old Quad. In 1901, Jackson started building the college's site on the northern side of New College Lane. By 1908, he had completed a new Chapel, which he declared to be his favourite work. Eventually, after much opposition, he built the Bridge of Sighs, linking the Old and New Quads across New College Lane, in 1913.

In the two world wars, a total of 171 members of Hertford College died (those of World War I are commemorated by a memorial on the south wall of the chancel in the Chapel, while those of World War II are remembered in a memorial in the portico, to the right of the Chapel door). Notable among them is Major Percy Nugent FitzPatrick, son of James Percy FitzPatrick, who was killed near Cambrai on 14 December 1917. It was with the death of his son that James Percy FitzPatrick made the suggestion after the war's end to keep a two-minute silence each year on Armistice Day.

In 1922, the novelist Evelyn Waugh came up to Hertford, famously feuding with his history tutor C. R. M. F. Cruttwell (who was to become the fourth principal of the refounded college, 1930–1939), and later naming a number of odious characters after him. Waugh wrote of his time at Hertford, 'I do no work here and never go to Chapel'. He novelised his time at Oxford in Brideshead Revisited, having his protagonist Charles Ryder at Hertford.

Starting from 1965, Hertford made a special effort to encourage applicants from state schools through the Hertford Scheme established by Physics Fellow Neil Tanner, in which candidates were interviewed early, outside the standard application process, and could be offered a place at the college without having to sit the university entrance exam. This had the effect of dramatically raising academic standards within the college, and other colleges introduced similar initiatives.  Today, around 70% of undergraduate students at the college come from UK state schools. This percentage of individuals from state schools (out of all UK applicants/students) is higher than at most Oxford colleges.  This commitment to diversity is in keeping with Hertford's earlier history of openness: in 1907 Hertford admitted the first African-American Rhodes Scholar, Alain Leroy Locke, after he had been refused by several other colleges.

Geoffrey Warnock served as the 9th Principal of the refounded college from 1971 until 1988, and presided over the latest period of growth, and established the college's leftist credentials. In 1974, Hertford became one of the first five co-educational colleges in the university (the others being Brasenose, Jesus College, St Catherine's, and Wadham). The college now has an almost equal gender balance, with slight variations from year to year. In memory of Warnock, the college has a student-accommodation building near Folly Bridge named after him. He also has a memorial in the Chapel, and a portrait behind High Table in the Hall.

Buildings 
Hertford College's main site is situated on Catte Street, New College Lane and Holywell Street. The site consists of three quadrangles: Old Quadrangle, New Quadrangle, and Holywell Quadrangle. The college also has three large groups of buildings for student accommodation near Folly Bridge: Warnock House, the Graduate Centre and Abingdon House. In addition to these, the college owns a number of houses around Oxford.

Old Quadrangle 
The Old Quadrangle (known as Old Quad or OB Quad, for Old Buildings) is, as the name suggests, the oldest and the original quadrangle. Its entrance is the through the Gatehouse on Catte Street, directly opposite the main gates of the Bodleian Library. The Gatehouse is a late 19th-century building by Thomas Graham Jackson, bearing the image of a drinking hart above the archway. However, the wooden doors with their colourful floral decoration are the gates of Hart Hall from the 17th century. The Gatehouse houses the Lodge.

Through the Gatehouse, the quadrangle is laid out around a pleasant lawn with a few decorative trees. The lawn is off-limits during Michaelmas and Hilary terms but is accessible during Trinity term for sitting on (at any time) and croquet (on Fridays and Sundays only).

In the north-east corner of the quad is the Old Hall, the oldest remaining buildings of Hart Hall, dating from the 1570s. The Old Hall and its adjoining Buttery are now in regular use for dining, especially by the Fellows. Running southwards, along the eastern side of the quad, is a 17th-century building, with oriel windows tucked away on its southern end. Originally, the portion closest to the Old Hall was student accommodation, and the southern portion was the principal's lodgings. Today the building is mostly taken over by the Senior Common Room, with the northern ground-floor room being the Old Library. In the south-east corner is the 18th-century Cottage, the only one of the planned four 'angles' of Dr Newton that was ever built. Originally, this occupied the entire corner, around to what was the chapel (and is now the library). Its southern side was demolished to make way for Jackson's Chapel.

The southern side of the quad consists of the Chapel, built in 1908 by Jackson, which has a particularly good acoustic. Its ante-chapel houses a stained-glass window depicting William Tyndale, made in 1911 for the British and Foreign Bible Society, and installed at Hertford in 1994. West of the Chapel is the Library, which was the previous chapel built in the 18th century by Newton. The Library possesses many fine, antique books, most of which belonged to the library of Magdalen Hall. Among these are many rare 17th-century manuscripts and an original edition of Thomas Hobbes's Leviathan given as a personal gift to the college: Hobbes prepared this work while at Magdalen Hall.

The western side of the quad has the Gatehouse, with the Lodge, in its centre. On either side of this are slightly earlier buildings, the southern of which is the Principal's Lodgings, and the northern mostly houses the college's offices. In addition, the north-west building has access onto the Bridge of Sighs. Above the Gatehouse is the dining Hall, which is wood-panelled and hung with a number of college portraits. The hall is reached from the quad by a distinctive stone spiral staircase designed by Jackson, and inspired by the spiral staircase at the Château de Blois.

The northern side of the quad consists of a building by Jackson, much of which now houses the Bursary. The building is infamous as the site of the incident novelised in Evelyn Waugh's Brideshead Revisited in which Sebastian Flyte, returning from a Bullingdon Club bender vomits through a window into a ground-floor room.

New Quadrangle 

The New Quadrangle (known as New Quad or NB Quad, for New Buildings) is connected to the Old Quadrangle, across New College Lane, by the Bridge of Sighs, which was designed by Thomas Graham Jackson. The north-western corner of New Quad is taken up by the Indian Institute building, which is not part of Hertford College. Most of the New Buildings are early 20th-century designs by Jackson, except the slightly later frontage onto Holywell Street by T.H. Hughes, on the northern side of the quad. The quad is entered through a gate onto Catte Street, just opposite the Clarendon Building. New Quad is mostly used for undergraduate accommodation.

The most significant building in the quad is the Octagon, just north of the gate on Catte Street, which houses the Middle Common Room. It is the 16th-century Chapel of St Mary the Virgin at Smithgate, which formed a bastion in the town walls. An original carving of the scene of the Annunciation can be seen from Catte Street, just beside the gate.

Holywell Quadrangle 

Holywell Quadrangle backs directly onto New Quad, and the two are connected by an arched corridor that also contains the steps down to Hertford's subterranean bar. Holywell Quad was built in 1975, and is almost exclusively for first-year undergraduate housing. Its main features are a gate onto Holywell Street, the Junior Common Room in the south-east corner, and the Baring Room (named after Thomas Baring, the college's major benefactor) which is a multi-purpose hall at the top of the southern staircase.

Student life 
Undergraduate students are accommodated for the full three or four years of their study, either on the main site or on college-owned property primarily in North Oxford and the Folly Bridge area. A new Hertford Graduate Centre fronting the Isis was built near Folly Bridge and was opened in 2000.

Hertford is home to a college cat named Simpkin, who lives in the College Lodge and is the fourth of his lineage, collectively Simpkins, the collective noun for Hertford College cats; the original was called Simpkin and was introduced by the former college principal Geoffrey Warnock, named after the cat in the Beatrix Potter novel The Tailor of Gloucester. He is provided with a bursary by alumni to cover his food and veterinary treatment.

Academic achievement 
Hertford's exam results are slightly above average. In the Norrington Table of results over the period 2006–2012 it has come 17th, 9th, 18th, 6th, 12th, 5th and 23rd.

Sport 

Hertford College Boat Club is among the leading Oxford college boat clubs: both its women's and men's first boats are in the first division of Torpids and Eights Week, with both M1 and W1 winning "blades" in the 2015 edition of Torpids. The boats and club room are in the Longbridges boathouse on the Isis. With the transition of Magdalen Hall to Hertford College in 1874, the old blue-black of the hall stopped racing in 1873, and the new red-white of the college took to the river in 1875. Within only seven years of its refoundation, the college came Head of the River in the annual college boat races, in 1881. On achieving that victory, the crew carried their boat all the way back to the college and burnt it just inside the gates. The college archives possess a letter detailing the club's celebrations from the sub-librarian of the Bodleian Library, who spent the night on the scaffolding surrounding the work on the Old Schools Tower, directly opposite the Hertford gate, in case the fire spread to the library. In 2005, the boathouse was gutted by an arson attack carried out by the Animal Liberation Front, in protest against animal testing at the university. The new boathouse was rebuilt on the same site.

The college was endowed with a new gym in 2011 and has playing fields in New Marston, which include a pavilion with facilities for most major team sports. In August 2013 Hertford College Rugby Club became the first team from the UK to tour Mongolia in official partnership with the Mongolian Rugby Football Union. They played matches against The Mongolia Defense University and the Ulaan Baatar Warriors. Both matches were played in the national stadium and broadcast live on Mongolian national television. In 2017, the team returned to Mongolia, this time playing two matches against the Ulaanbaatar Warriors.

Music 
Hertford College has the largest and most active music society of any Oxford college, drawing in musicians from around the university, with ensembles including the Hertford College Orchestra, the Hertford College Chapel Choir, the Hertford College Wind Band, the Hertford College Jazz Band and the Hertford College Bruckner Orchestra. 
There are two competitive organ scholarships. The Chapel's fine acoustic lends itself to concerts and recitals, and it is frequently used for recording.

People associated with the college

Principals 

The current Principal of the college, from 2020, is former UK Ambassador to Lebanon and policy advisor Tom Fletcher.

Selected current Professorial and Tutorial Fellows 
The college has over 30 Tutorial Fellows in the subjects it offers at undergraduate level.

Hagan Bayley, Professor of Chemical Biology
Charlotte Brewer, Professor of English Language and Literature, Tutor in English
 Dame Kay Davies, FRS, Dr Lee's Professor of Anatomy
Martin C.J. Maiden, Professor of Molecular Epidemiology, Tutor in Biology
Ian McBride, Foster Professor of Irish History
Peter Millican, Gilbert Ryle Fellow, Professor and Tutor in Philosophy
Christopher J. Schofield, Professor of Organic Chemistry
Emma J. Smith, Professor of Shakespeare Studies, Tutor in English
David Ian Stuart, Professor of Structural Biology
David Thomas, Professor of Geography
Claire Vallance, Professor of Physical Chemistry, Tutor in Chemistry
Michael Wooldridge, Professor of Computer Science
Alison Woollard, Associate Professor in Genetics, Tutor in Biochemistry

Emeritus Fellows 
The college has a number of Emeritus Fellows, including:

 Toby Barnard, historian
 Martin Biddle, archaeologist
 Robin Devenish, former professor and Tutor in Physics
 Bill Macmillan
 Tom Paulin, former G M Young Lecturer and Tutor in English
 Christopher Tyerman, former Professor of History of the Crusades and Tutor in History
 Alison Young, former Professor of Public Law

Honorary Fellows 

 John Baring, 7th Baron Ashburton
 Walter Bodmer, former principal
 Martin Bridson, mathematician
Nancee Oku Bright, documentary filmmaker, director and producer 
 Sherard Cowper-Coles
 John Dewar, former Tutor in Law
 Richard W. Fisher, ambassador
 Roy Foster, historian
 Andrew Goudie, Master of St Cross College
 Charlotte Hogg, economist
 Will Hutton, economist and former Principal
 The Very Reverend Jeffrey John, Dean of St Albans
 Sir Jeffrey Jowell QC, barrister
 Sowetto Kinch, jazz musician and rapper
 John Landers, former principal
 Paul Manduca, chairman of Prudential plc (2012-2020)
 The Rt. Rev. Thomas McMahon, Catholic Bishop of Brentwood
 Paul Muldoon, President of the Poetry Society
 David Pannick, Baron Pannick
 Mary Robinson, former President of Ireland
 Jacqui Smith, former Home Secretary
 Stephanie West, classical scholar
 General Roger Wheeler, former Chief of the General Staff
 Tobias Wolff, author

Notable former students

Hart Hall and the first Hertford College (1282–1816)

Magdalen Hall (1480–1874)

The second Hertford College (1874–present)

References

Sources 
 
  also at Internet archive 
 
 
 'Hertford history'. Hertford history

External links 

 Hertford College website
 Hertford College Boat Club
 Hertford College MCR
 Hertford College International Programmes

 
Colleges of the University of Oxford
Educational institutions established in the 13th century
1282 establishments in England
Buildings and structures of the University of Oxford